"Rebirth of Slick (Cool Like Dat)" is a song by American hip hop trio Digable Planets, released as the first single from their debut album, Reachin' (A New Refutation of Time and Space), in November 1992. The black-and-white music video was directed by Morgan Lawley. The song contains a sample from "Stretching" by Art Blakey & the Jazz Messengers.

"Rebirth of Slick" peaked at  15 on the US Billboard Hot 100 during the week of March 6, 1993, becoming the group's only top-40 single. During that time, the song also topped the Hot Rap Singles chart. The single was certified gold by the Recording Industry Association of America (RIAA) on March 16, 1993, for sales of 500,000 copies. The song won the Grammy Award for Best Rap Performance by a Duo or Group at the 36th Grammy Awards. In 2021, Cleveland.com ranked the song as number 142 of the best 200 rap songs, calling it "the pinnacle of jazz rap."

Track listing
US 12-inch single
A1. "Rebirth of Slick (Cool Like Dat)" (Crashing Giant Step mix) – 4:34
A2. "Rebirth of Slick (Cool Like Dat)" (Crashing Instymix) – 4:34
A3. "Rebirth of Slick (Cool Like Dat)" (7-inch mix) – 4:05
B1. "Rebirth of Slick (Cool Like Dat)" (Uh-Oh Planet Earth Albumix) – 4:22
B2. "Rebirth of Slick (Cool Like Dat)" (Uh-Oh Planet Earth Instymix) – 4:22

Charts

Weekly charts

Year-end charts

Certifications

|}

Release history

References

External links
 

1992 debut singles
1992 songs
Black-and-white music videos
Digable Planets songs
Elektra Records singles
Pendulum Records singles